John Speare Tosswill (6 August 1890 – 28 September 1915), sometimes known as Jack Tosswill, was an English professional footballer who played as an inside right in the Football League for Liverpool. His partial deafness "used to cause some curious happenings in football matches, for he was not able to hear the referee's signal and oftimes was seen to proceed to score goals while the crowd and other players were waiting to take a free kick!". Tosswill also played cricket for Eastbourne.

Personal life 
Tosswill was partially deaf. He enlisted as a corporal in the Royal Engineers soon after Britain's entry into the First World War in August 1914. Before he could serve overseas, an illness suffered while stationed in Southampton led to Tosswill returning to Eastbourne. He died on 28 September 1915, following an operation at Eastbourne Military Hospital. Tosswill was buried in Ocklynge Cemetery, Eastbourne.

Career statistics

References

External links
 LFC History profile
 

1890 births
English footballers
Liverpool F.C. players
Association football inside forwards
English Football League players
1915 deaths
British Army personnel of World War I
British military personnel killed in World War I
Royal Engineers soldiers
Sportspeople from Eastbourne
Eastbourne Town F.C. players
Hastings & St Leonards United F.C. players
Aberdare Town F.C. players
Tunbridge Wells F.C. players
Maidstone United F.C. (1897) players
Queens Park Rangers F.C. players
Southend United F.C. players
Coventry City F.C. players
Deaf association football players
Southern Football League players
English deaf people